Europress Bookshelf is a series of interactive storybooks for children, developed by Europress Software and published by Q Range on CD-ROM for Mac OS and Windows, using their own games creator Klik & Play to produce the products with minimal programming. The games came under three series including "Read & Play" for younger readers, "Topsy and Tim" based on the Adamson books and "Living Classics".

Games

Gameplay
Each product opens in a map screen where the player can click the option to have the story read from beginning to end continuously, click any of the chapter points on the map, play one of several games included or read information about the book author and the book itself. On each page of the story, the player can stop the reading at any time, click interactive objects to trigger animations and click on any highlighted special words to get their definitions.

Products

Development
Europress hired professional animators from the film industry to illustrate the characters and interactive objects in the games. Daphne Oxenford was hired to narrate the "Read & Play" stories. The "Living Classics" soundtrack was done with Dolby Surround Sound. The series was released in many languages including English, French, German, Spanish, Italian, Norwegian, Swedish and Danish.

Release
The first three "Living Classics" were translated into Spanish.

See also
 Magic Tales
 Disney's Animated Storybook
 Living Books
 Playtoons
 The Kidstory Series

References

External links
Official website

1995 video games
Classic Mac OS games
Software for children
Video game franchises
Video game franchises introduced in 1995
Video games based on novels
Video games developed in the United Kingdom
Windows games
Children's educational video games